Amara Shune Lei is a Burmese model and beauty pageant titleholder who was crowned as Miss Earth Myanmar 2020.She represented the Myanmar at the Miss Earth 2020 pageant and finally she was placed in Top 8.

She was crowned Miss Grand Myanmar 2021. She competed at Miss Grand International 2021 in Bangkok, Thailand on 4 December 2021 and Placing as Top 20

She is the first Burmese Beauty Queen who got placement twice in Major and Minor Beauty Pageants (Miss Earth and Miss Grand International)
.

Pageantry

Miss Sunkist 2019
Amara competed in the Miss Sunkist Myanmar 2019 pageant which was held on October 9 and 10 in Junction City, Yangon. At the end of the event, she was crowned as Miss Sunkist 2019.

Miss Earth Myanmar 2020

Amara Shune Lei, representing Yangon East, was crowned Miss Earth Myanmar 2020 which was held on 2020 August 31. She succeeds Miss Earth Myanmar 2019, May Thadar Ko for the title.

Miss Earth 2020
Amara competed in the Miss Earth 2020 pageant which was held virtually. The pageant preliminary was streamed online on virtual channel KTX on 24 November 2020. She was placed in the top 8. This is the highest replacement at international pageant.

 Special Awards:
 Beach Wear
 Evening Gown
 Sports Wear
 Talent Competition (Creative)
 Best National Costume

Miss Grand Myanmar 2021
Amara was appointed as Miss Grand Myanmar 2021 by National Director of Miss Grand Myanmar.

Miss Grand International 2021
Miss Grand Myanmar 2021, Amara Shune Lei represented Myanmar at the Miss Grand International 2021 pageant which was held in Bangkok, Thailand in December 2021. At the end of the event, she was placed in the top 20.

References

External links

1996 births
Miss Grand Myanmar
Burmese beauty pageant winners
Burmese female models
Living people
Miss Earth 2020 contestants
Miss Grand International contestants